Harry Hershfield (October 13, 1885 – December 15, 1974) was an American cartoonist, humor writer and radio personality. He was known as "the Jewish Will Rogers". Hershfield also was a columnist for the New York Daily Mirror. His books include Laugh Louder, Live Longer and Now I'll Tell One. As a comics artist he is best remembered for his newspaper comic Abie the Agent.

Biography
He was born in Cedar Rapids, Iowa on October 13, 1885 to Jewish immigrants.

He studied in Chicago at the Frank Holmes School of Illustration and the Chicago Art Institute. His career began at age 14, drawing sports cartoons and his comic strip about a dog, Homeless Hector, for the Chicago Daily News in 1899. He then went West, drawing for the San Francisco Chronicle by 1907. He married Sarah Jane Isdell (?-1960).

In 1909, he was hired by Arthur Brisbane to work for William Randolph Hearst's New York Evening Journal. He switched to the New York Graphic where he drew If I'm Wrong, Sue Me!, and when the Graphic folded, he went to the New York Herald Tribune and drew Meyer the Buyer.

During the 1930s, Hershfield was in demand as a banquet toastmaster, averaging some 200 banquets and dinners annually. 
During his lifetime, he was toastmaster or master of ceremonies at an estimated 16,000 events, including charity affairs, dinners and stage benefits.

Involved in a legal battle with Hearst from 1933 to 1935, Hershfield drew a Sunday half-page, According to Hoyle, for the New York Herald-Tribune during those years.

On March 11, 1938, he was signed to manage the story department of MGM's cartoon studio. He later commented, "They were so glad to welcome me, the day I arrived they gave me a farewell dinner."

He began radio work with a program named One Man's Opinion on WMCA. The 15-minute program broadcast at midnight featured a "breezy review of shows he just left". Soon after he brought Abie the Agent to an end during 1940, he became a well-known radio personality, telling jokes on the programs Stop Me If You've Heard This One and Can You Top This? He was a frequent guest of early television programs during the 1950s.

He died on December 15, 1974 at Saint Clare's Hospital in Manhattan.

Strip bibliography
Names and dates from Holtz's American Newspaper Comics: An Enyclopedic Reference Guide:

 War's Ebb and Flow (weekdays, Jan 3 - Feb 14, 1906) - Chicago Daily News
 Homeless Hector (weekdays, Jan 4, 1906 - Oct 20, 1908) - Chicago Daily News
 Bill Slowguy (weekdays, Feb 8, 1906 - Oct 19, 1908) - Chicago Daily News
 Christopher's Luck (weekdays, Oct 16 - Dec 23, 1907) - Chicago Daily News
 Adventures of a Fly (weekdays, Nov 4 - Dec 3, 1907) - Chicago Daily News
 Tiny Tinkles (weekdays, Jan 7-16, 1908) - Chicago Daily News
 The Luck of Christopher (weekdays, Feb 18 - June 2, 1908) - Chicago Daily News
 The Fortune Teller (weekdays, Apr 15 - Sept 16, 1908) - Chicago Daily News
 The Piker's Rubaiyat (daily, Nov 11 - Dec 26, 1908) - San Francisco Chronicle
 Raffles (daily, May 6–23, 1909) - San Francisco Chronicle
 Desperate Desmond (daily, March 11, 1910 - Oct 15, 1912) - National News Association
 Little Phillip (weekdays, 1911) - New York Journal
 Dauntless Durham of the USA (daily, Jan 22, 1913 - Jan 31, 1914) - Hearst Syndicate
 Abie the Agent (daily/Sundays, Feb 12, 1914 - 1940) - International Feature Syndicate for 1914-1932, King Features Syndicate for 1935-1940
 Hard Hearted Hickey (daily, Nov 6, 1927 - March 12, 1928, written as Darrell McClure) - Premier Syndicate
 Vanilla and the Villains (daily, Sept 10, 1928 - 1930, written as Darrell McClure) - King Features Syndicate
 Meyer the Buyer (daily/Sundays, Feb 15 - May 9, 1932) - New York Graphic
 According to Hoyle (Sundays, March 4, 1934 - July 28, 1935) - New York Tribune

Sunday toppers for Abie the Agent:
 Homeless Hector (reprise) (1912, 1927-1932)
 Dictated But Not Read (1926)
 Phooy Phables (1926)

Legacy
Ron Goulart, in Encyclopedia of American Comics, described Hershfield's cartoon humor:
Hershfield drew in a vigorous, primitive cartoon style, and was enormously fond of shading, crosshatching and other basic inking techniques. Occasionally, he favored collages and sometimes made fun of other artists styles. In 1910, he started Desperate Desmond, a humorous continuity strip burlesquing melodramas, dime novels, and fiction weeklies that went in for the hairbreadth rescue and gloating villain sort of material. In addition to the villainous, top-hatted Desmond, the strip featured the stalwart Claude Éclair and the put-upon blond heroine, Rosamond. Hershfield's enthusiastic kidding of this sort of cliffhanger hokum did little to sour the public on its conventions. However, within a few years, such motion picture serials as The Exploits of Elaine and The Perils of Pauline would be attracting audiences to movie houses by doing the stuff completely straight.

In 1912, Hershfield switched heroes and introduced a new strip called Dauntless Durham of the U.S.A. Durham, a handsome, pipe-smoking combination of Sherlock Holmes, Nick Carter and Frank Merriwell, was the soul of honor and polite to a fault. The object of his affection was the beautiful Katrina. In 1914, Hershfield abandoned parody for a quieter sort of humor and created Abie the Agent. The strip continued until 1940 and dealt with contemporary Jewish life in a big city. Hershfield specialized in gags with a Yiddish flavor.

The character was animated for the movie Abie Kabibble Outwitted a Rival (1917).

References

Further reading
Dunning, John (1998). On the Air: The Encyclopedia of Old-Time Radio. New York: Oxford University Press. 
Strickler, Dave. Syndicated Comic Strips and Artists, 1924-1995: The Complete Index. Cambria, CA: Comics Access, 1995. .

External links 
Harry Hershfield collection, 1896-1974 (bulk 1930s-1960s), held by the Billy Rose Theatre Division, New York Public Library for the Performing Arts
The Ohio State University Billy Ireland Cartoon Library & Museum: Harry Hershfield Collection guide
Christopher Wheeler Gallery: Harry Hershfield
Lambiek Comiclopedia: Harry Hershfield
Michael Vance on Harry Hershfield

1885 births
1974 deaths
Writers from Cedar Rapids, Iowa
American humorists
American radio personalities
American comic strip cartoonists
American comics artists
Jewish American artists
Artists from Cedar Rapids, Iowa
The Lambs presidents